Endang Witarsa (born Liem Sun-Yu; 16 October 1916 – 2 April 2008) was an Indonesian former football player and coach. Witarsa trained as a dentist, but discoveredthat his passion lay with football. During his youth, he joined UMS (Union Makes Strength), a Chinese Indonesian football club, in 1948 as a halfback. When he retired in 1951, he became a coach. Witarsa received a Lifetime Achievement Award from Badan Liga Indonesia in October 2006 because of his dedication for nearly 70 years as a player and coach. Witarsa died on April 2, 2008, at Pluit Hospital, Jakarta.

Statistics

|}
*This is an incomplete list

References

  Endang Witarsa Story

1916 births
2008 deaths
People from Kebumen Regency
Indonesian people of Chinese descent
Indonesian sportspeople of Chinese descent
Indonesian football managers
Indonesian footballers
Indonesia national football team managers
Indonesia international footballers
Footballers at the 1951 Asian Games
Footballers at the 1954 Asian Games
Association footballers not categorized by position
Asian Games competitors for Indonesia
Sportspeople from Central Java